The 2010 European Short Course Swimming Championships was held 25–28 November 2010 at Pieter van den Hoogenband Zwemstadion in Eindhoven, Netherlands. The meet featured competition amongst national teams from Europe, in 38 short course (25m) swimming events.

The competition featured a preliminary/semifinals/final format for the 50 and 100 events, a timed-final format (swimmers swim only once) in the 800/1500 freestyles, and prelims/final for all other events. Preliminary heats were swum in morning sessions; Semifinals and Finals in evening sessions.

Each nation was permitted to enter three swimmers into each individual event; with a maximum of 2 eligible to advance on to Semifinals/Finals.

Participating nations
36 nations have announced their participation

 (1)

 (15)

 (15)

 (1)
 (6)

 (26)

Results

Men's events

Legend: WR - World record; WBT - World best time; ER - European record; CR - Championship record

Women's events

Legend: WR - World record; WBT - World best time; ER - European record; CR - Championship record

Medal table

Records
The table below lists the World (WR), European (ER) and Championships (CR) records broken at the meet. Times displayed in shaded cells were subsequently broken later in the meet.

See also
2010 in swimming

References

External links
Event website: www.ecswimming2010.nl
Results book

European Short Course Swimming Championships
European Short Course Swimming Championships
2010
Sports competitions in Eindhoven
Swimming competitions in the Netherlands
International aquatics competitions hosted by the Netherlands
November 2010 sports events in Europe
21st century in Eindhoven